The following is a list of photovoltaic power stations that are larger than 300 megawatts (MW) in current net capacity. Most are individual photovoltaic power stations, but some are groups of co-located plants owned by different independent power producers and with separate transformer connections to the grid. Wiki-Solar reports total global capacity of utility-scale photovoltaic plants to be some 96 GWAC which generated 1.3% of global power by the end of 2016.

The size of photovoltaic power stations has increased progressively over the last decade with frequent new capacity records. The 97 MW Sarnia Photovoltaic Power Plant went online in 2010. Huanghe Hydropower Golmud Solar Park reached 200 MW in 2012. In August 2012, Agua Caliente Solar Project in Arizona reached 247 MW only to be passed by three larger plants in 2013. In 2014, two plants were tied as largest: Topaz Solar Farm, a PV solar plant at 550 MWAC in central coast area and a second 550-MW plant, the Desert Sunlight Solar Farm located in the far eastern desert region of California. 
These two plants were superseded by a new world's largest facility in June 2015 when the 579 MWAC Solar Star project went online in the Antelope Valley region of Los Angeles County, California. 
In 2016, the largest photovoltaic power station in the world was the 850 MW Longyangxia Dam Solar Park, in Gonghe County, Qinghai, China. This was passed in 2019 with the completion of the Pavagada Solar Park in Karnataka, India, with a capacity of 2050 MW. The Pavagada Solar Park is also the first solar power park to cross the 2 GW mark.

Bhadla Solar Park became the largest solar park in 2020 with a capacity of 2,245 MW.

As with other forms of power generation, significant challenges exist with regard to regional habitat modification, such as that resulting from the heat island effect, and the resulting stress to local threatened species.  Several planned large facilities in the U.S. state of California have been downsized due in part to such concerns.

World's largest photovoltaic power stations 
The following is a list of operating solar farms that are 300 MW or larger. BloombergNEF reports that 35 projects of at least 200 MW were commissioned in 2019, up from 30 in 2018.

These lists include a mixture of individual solar power plants and of groups of co-located projects, usually called solar parks.

Timeline of the largest PV power stations

Largest PV power stations in each country

See also

Community solar farm
List of solar thermal power stations
List of energy storage projects
List of largest power stations in the world
List of rooftop photovoltaic installations
List of renewable energy topics by country
Photovoltaic power station
Photovoltaics
Renewable energy commercialization
Renewable energy industry
Renewable energy in the European Union
Solar energy
Solar power satellite

References

Further reading
Clean Tech Nation: How the U.S. Can Lead in the New Global Economy (2012) by Ron Pernick and Clint Wilder
Deploying Renewables 2011 (2011) by the International Energy Agency
Reinventing Fire: Bold Business Solutions for the New Energy Era (2011) by Amory Lovins
Renewable Energy Sources and Climate Change Mitigation (2011) by the IPCC
Solar Energy Perspectives (2011) by the International Energy Agency

External links

PV Resources.com - World's largest photovoltaic power plants
Solar Energy Industry Association - Large Solar Projects in the US
Bureau of Land Management 2012 Renewable Energy Priority Projects

Renewable energy commercialization
List
Photovoltaic

hu:Fotovillamos naperőmű